The Saturday Sessions: The Dermot O'Leary Show is a 2-disc compilation album of BBC Radio 2 popular music recordings, released in the United Kingdom in July 2007. Many of the artists featured were first introduced by English radio personality and television presenter, Dermot O'Leary.

Track listing
Disc 1
The Feeling - "Walk Like an Egyptian" (originally by The Bangles)
Lily Allen - "Everybody's Changing" (originally by Keane)
Amy Winehouse - "To Know Him Is to Love Him" (originally by The Teddy Bears)
The Raconteurs - "Steady, As She Goes"
Kasabian - "Pictures of Matchstick Men" (originally by Status Quo)
Kings of Leon - "On Call"
Manic Street Preachers - "Motorcycle Emptiness"
The New York Fund - "Nobody Home"
Gomez - "Wichita Lineman" (originally by Glen Campbell)
Massive Attack - "Live With Me"
Camera Obscura - "Super Trouper" (originally by ABBA)
KT Tunstall - "I Want You Back" (originally by The Jackson 5)
Jont - "Number 1" (originally by Goldfrapp)
Willy Mason - "Careless Whisper" (originally by Wham!)
Guillemots - "Made-Up Lovesong 43"
The Shins - "Breathe" (originally by Pink Floyd)
Nerina Pallot - "Confide in Me" (originally by Kylie Minogue)
The Electric Soft Parade - "Silent to the Dark"
The Thrills - "Nothing Changes Around Here"
Jamie T - "A New England" (originally by Billy Bragg)
Mumm-Ra - "In Between Days" (originally by The Cure)
Bloc Party - "Two More Years"

Disc 2
Mika - "Grace Kelly"
The Kooks - "She Moves in Her Own Way"
James Morrison - "Wonderful World"
Ray LaMontagne - "Trouble"
The Magic Numbers - "Love Me Like You"
Orson - "I Can't Go For That (No Can Do)" (originally by Hall & Oates)
Athlete - "God Only Knows" (originally by The Beach Boys)
Stoney - "Waterfall" (originally by The Stone Roses)
Paul Weller - "Come On/Let's Go"
Ben Kweller - "In Other Words"
Supergrass - "Richard III"
Stars - "This Charming Man" (originally by The Smiths)
Zero 7 - "I Go to Sleep" (originally by The Kinks, notably by The Pretenders)
Rufus Wainwright - "Hallelujah" (originally by Leonard Cohen)
Scott Matthews - "The Boy with the Thorn in His Side" (originally by The Smiths)
Bat For Lashes - "I'm On Fire" (originally by Bruce Springsteen)
Josh Pyke - "Middle of the Hill"
Turin Brakes - "Breaking the Girl" (originally by Red Hot Chili Peppers)
The Little Ones - "Oh, MJ!"
The Bees - "Who Cares What the Question Is?"
Low vs Diamond - "Moonage Daydream" (originally by David Bowie)
Beck - "Lost Cause"

References

2007 compilation albums
EMI Records compilation albums